Helichrysum splendidum is a species of flowering plant in the family Asteraceae, found in Africa and Yemen A hardy evergreen perennial, it occurs from the Southern Cape to Ethiopia along the eastern escarpment mountains, favouring rocky places in fynbos, grassland and savanna biomes. It forms mound-shaped aggregations 1–2 meters high, sometimes covering entire hillsides. The species is found in South Africa, Eswatini, Lesotho, Tanzania, Ethiopia, South Sudan, Malawi, Zimbabwe, Zambia and Yemen. The distribution of this species is clearly anthropogenic, that is, closely linked to the movements of man through the ages.

The leaves are10–30 (–40) x 1–2 (–6) mm, linear, linear-oblong or linear-lanceolate, with revolute margins. Leaves have a blue-grey colour and are softly woolly on the under surface, as are the young stems. The upper surface is markedly parallel-veined and grooved, the veins protruding on the under side.

This species is known in cultivation, and has gained the Royal Horticultural Society's Award of Garden Merit.

Helichrysums are a rich source of traditional medicines in South Africa. This species has pleasantly aromatic leaves from which an essential oil used in aromatherapy can be derived.  The oil's main components are β-pinene, β-phellandrene, δ-cadinene, germacrene D, and 1,8-cineole.

References

External links
 
 Phylogenetic incongruence in Helichrysum

splendidum